is a freight terminal in Hachinohe, Aomori, Japan, operated by Japan Freight Railway Company (JR Freight).

Lines
Hachinohe Freight Terminal is used by freight trains on the Tōhoku Main Line and Hachinohe Line. The terminal is also used by trains operating to and from the Hachinohe Rinkai Railway Line.

History
The terminal opened on 1 December 1970 as a junction of Japanese National Railways (JNR) and the Hachinohe Rinkai Railway. Following privatization on 1 April 1987, the terminal was transferred from JNR to JR Freight ownership.

See also
 List of railway stations in Japan

External links
 Hachinohe Freight Terminal (JR Freight) 

Rail transport in Aomori Prefecture
Railway freight terminals in Japan
Stations of Japan Freight Railway Company